GIC may refer to:

Education 
 Galle International College, in Sri Lanka
 Ghana Insurance College, in Accra, Ghana
 Government Intermediate College, a type of school in India
 Grait International College in Nigeria
 Gyosei International College in the U.K., defunct

Finance 
 General Insurance Corporation of India
 GIC (Singaporean sovereign wealth fund), previously known as Government of Singapore Investment Corporation, a Singaporean sovereign wealth fund
 Guaranteed Investment Certificate in Canada
 Guaranteed investment contract in the United States

Other uses 
 Gic, a village in Veszprém County, Hungary
Gic, Afghanistan, a village in Afghanistan
 Boigu Island Airport, in Queensland, Australia
 Gayle language, spoken in South Africa
 Gender identity clinic
 Geomagnetically induced current
 Geumsan Insam Cello, a South Korean cycling team
 Glass ionomer cement, used in dentistry
 Global Industrial Company, where GIC is the company's stock ticker symbol
 Global Interdependence Center
 Graphite intercalation compound
 Idaho County Airport, in Idaho, United States